Louie is a moderately common given name, related to the more common name Louis. It originated in the United Kingdom (where Louis is pronounced ) as a more regularly-spelled version without a silent ⟨s⟩.  In 2011, it was the 74th most common forename for births in England and Wales, with Louis only slightly more common at 68th. In the United States, Louis (there pronounced ) is far more common.

The name is unisex; it is usually considered a masculine given name, as a derivation of Louis, but is occasionally given to girls as a diminutive of Louise.

Variant forms 
 English: Louis, Lewis, Lou, Lewes, Ludovic
 Arabic: Luay
 French: Louis, Ludovic
 Portuguese: Luís, Luiz
 German: Ludwig
 Italian: Luigi, Ludovico, Lodovico
 Polish: Ludwik
 Spanish: Luis
 Dutch: Lodewijk
 Catalan: Lluís

Notable people 

 Louie Anderson (1953–2022), American stand-up comedian, actor and television host
 Louie Bellson (1924–2009), Italian-American jazz drummer
 Louie Bennett (1870–1956), Irish suffragette, trade unionist, journalist and writer
 Louie Bickerton (1902–1998), Australian female tennis player
 Louie Dampier (born 1944), former American Basketball Association and National Basketball Association player
 Louie DeBrusk, Canadian former National Hockey League player
 Louie Espinoza (born 1962), American boxer
 Louie Giglio (born 1958), American pastor, public speaker, author and founder of the Passion Movement
 Louie Gohmert (born 1953), American politician
 Louie R. Guenthner, Jr. (1944–2012), American attorney and politician
 Louie Kelcher (born 1953), American former National Football League player
 Louie E. Lewis (1893–1968), American politician
 Louie McCarthy-Scarsbrook (born 1986), English rugby league footballer
 Louie Nelson (born 1951), American former National Basketball Association player
 Louie B. Nunn (1924–2004), American politician, 52nd governor of Kentucky
 Louie Ramirez (1938–1993), American boogaloo, salsa and latin jazz percussionist, vibraphonist, band leader and composer
 Louie Richardson (born 1985), Canadian Football League player
 Louie Simmons (1947–2022), American powerlifter and strength coach
 Louie Spence (born 1969), British dancer
 Louie Spicolli, American professional wrestler, who died aged 27
 Louie Myfanwy Thomas (1908–1968), Welsh author best known under the pseudonym Jane Ann Jones
 Louie Vito (born 1988), American professional snowboarder
 Louie Welch (1918–2008), American politician, mayor of Houston (1964-1973)

Fictional characters
 Louie, a mafia member in the television series The Simpsons
 Huey, Dewey, and Louie, Donald Duck's nephews in the Mickey Mouse universe
 Louie, space co-pilot to Captain Olimar in the Pikmin Universe
 King Louie, in the 1967 Disney animated film Disney's Jungle Book
 Louie, one of the protagonist in the film adaptation of Anne Rice's novel, "Interview With The Vampire"
 Buzz Saw Louie, a character in the VeggieTales video, The Toy That Saved Christmas

References

See also 
 Louis (given name)
 Lewis (given name)
 Luigi (given name)
 Ludwig (given name)
 Ludovic (given name)

Masculine given names
Hypocorisms